Wang Shoupeng (1875–1929) was the acting president of Shandong University in Jinan from 1926 to 1927. He was the second president of the university.

1875 births
1929 deaths
Educators from Shandong
Presidents of Shandong University
Writers from Weifang
Chinese travel writers
Poets from Shandong